Emil Studer (born 11 May 1914, date of death unknown) was a Swiss gymnast who competed in the 1948 Summer Olympics.

References

1914 births
Year of death missing
Swiss male artistic gymnasts
Olympic gymnasts of Switzerland
Gymnasts at the 1948 Summer Olympics
Olympic silver medalists for Switzerland
Olympic medalists in gymnastics
Medalists at the 1948 Summer Olympics
20th-century Swiss people